General elections were held in the Dominican Republic on 5 July 2020 to elect a president, vice-president, 32 senators and 190 deputies. They had originally been planned for 17 May, but were postponed due to the coronavirus pandemic. They are the second elections since 1994 in which all positions will be elected simultaneously, and the first in Dominican history in which all authorities will be elected simultaneously and directly.

Incumbent President Danilo Medina was ineligible to stand for re-election, having served two consecutive terms since 2012. The governing Dominican Liberation Party's 16-year rule ended after Modern Revolutionary Party candidate Luis Abinader received a majority of the vote. Rival candidates Gonzalo Castillo and Leonel Fernández also conceded defeat. The Modern Revolutionary Party also won a majority of seats in the Senate and a plurality in the Chamber of Deputies. The election was a partial realignment, with the Modern Revolutionary Party entering a status as a major party in the country, replacing the Dominican Revolutionary Party, who saw poor election results for the second election in a row and who obtained its lowest total vote share and seat count in its history. Abinader would be officially sworn in as President on 16 August.

Electoral system
The President of the Dominican Republic is elected using the two-round system; if no candidate receives 50% + 1 vote, or more, of the total votes, a second-round runoff will be held between the two candidates with the highest votes on the first round.

The 32 members of the Senate are elected from the 31 provinces and the Distrito Nacional using first-past-the-post voting.

The 190 members of the Chamber of Deputies are elected in three groups; 178 are elected by proportional representation from 32 multi-member constituencies based on the 31 provinces and the Distrito Nacional, with the number of seats based on the population of each province. A further seven members are elected by proportional representation by Dominican expatriates in 3 overseas constituencies, and five seats are allocated at the national level to parties that received at least 1% of the vote nationally, giving preference to those that did not win any of the 178 constituency seats.

The 20 seats in the Central American Parliament are elected by proportional representation.

Presidential candidates

Opinion polls

President

Party identification and Congress

Conduct
It was initially reported that representatives of the Organization of American States (OAS) would arrive to the Dominican Republic on 13 February 2020 to monitor the elections. The general election to elect the President and members of the Dominican Republic parliament, which was postponed from the scheduled 17 May 2020 date due to the COVID-19 pandemic, was later held on 5 July 2020.

Local media reported that the elections proceeded smoothly, except for one incident, when a person was shot inside a polling station after an argument erupted between rival party supporters.

Results

President
Luis Abinader won the presidential election in the first round, obtaining over 50% of the vote. During the election count, the ruling Dominican Liberation Party's candidate Gonzalo Castillo conceded defeat, stating that the official count "shows that there is an irreversible trend and that from now on we have a president-elect... Our congratulations to Mr Luis Abinader." Former President Leonel Fernández, who left the ruling party and ran for the presidency as a member of the People's Force party, also conceded defeat. Abinader was sworn in as President of the Dominican Republic on 16 August 2020.

Senate
The Modern Revolutionary Party won an absolute majority in the Senate on their own, seeing their seat total increase by 15, while the ruling Dominican Liberation party lost over 75% of their prior seats.

Chamber of Deputies
The Modern Revolutionary Party won a plurality of votes and seats, seeing their seat count more than double. The ruling Dominican Liberation Party lost nearly 30% of their prior seats. No party has a majority on their own in the Chamber, meaning alliances or coalitions will need to be made to guarantee the passage of bills. A total of 96 seats is needed for a majority.

References

 

Dominican
General election
Elections in the Dominican Republic
Dominican
Dominican
Presidential elections in the Dominican Republic